Carlos Camins Y Hernandez (November 4, 1887 – August 11, 1970) was the former governor of the old Zamboanga Province from 1931 to 1934. His parents were Francisco Camins, a member of the Spanish Navy Unit stationed in Zamboanga and the Portuguese Mariquita Hernandez Camins. Camins studied in Manila. He was a journalist, publisher and editor of El Finex, a Spanish newspaper, La Anorcha and El Sur. During his term as governor he developed the Abuano Barracks in the municipality of Aurora, now under the province of Zamboanga del Sur.

See also
 Zamboanga City

References

1887 births
1970 deaths
Filipino people of Catalan descent
Filipino people of Portuguese descent
People from Zamboanga City
Governors of former provinces of the Philippines